Sydvesten (The Southwest) is a local Norwegian newspaper published once a week in Bergen in Hordaland county.

Sydvesten covers events in the boroughs of Laksevåg and Fyllingsdalen. When the newspaper was launched in 1994, it was originally called Lokalavisen for Fyllingsdalen og Bønes (The Local Newspaper for Fyllingsdalen and Bønes). In March 2002 its coverage expanded to include Laksevåg. From January 25, 2013, to August 2015, Laksevåg was covered by the affiliated paper Lyderhorn, which then folded. Now Sydvesten once again covers both Fyllingsdalen and Laksevåg.

Sydvesten is owned by the company Bydelsavisene Bergen AS and is published every Tuesday, except for four weeks in July.

Circulation
According to the Norwegian Audit Bureau of Circulations and National Association of Local Newspapers, Sydvesten has had the following annual circulation:
2004: 2,185
2005: 2,352
2006: 2,188
2007: 2,146
2008: 2,031
2009: 1,847
2010: 1,752
2011: 1,756
2012: 1,581
2013: 1,416
2014: 1,180
2015: 1,513
2016: 1,746

References

External links
Sydvesten homepage

Newspapers published in Norway
Norwegian-language newspapers
Bergen
Mass media in Hordaland
Publications established in 1994
1994 establishments in Norway